Barbara Pierce Bush (born November 25, 1981) is an American activist. She co-founded and is the chair of the board of the nonprofit organization Global Health Corps. She and her fraternal twin sister, Jenna, are the daughters of the 43rd U.S. President George W. Bush and former First Lady Laura Bush. She is also a granddaughter of former President George H. W. Bush and Barbara Bush, after whom she is named.

Early life and education 

Barbara Pierce Bush was born on 25 November 1981 at Baylor University Medical Center in Dallas, Texas. When the family lived in the Preston Hollow section of Dallas, she and her twin sister, Jenna, attended Preston Hollow Elementary School; Laura Bush served on Preston Hollow's Parent-Teacher Association at that time. Later, Barbara and Jenna attended The Hockaday School in Dallas. When her father became Governor of Texas in 1994, Barbara attended St. Andrew's Episcopal School in Austin, Texas. She began Austin High School in 1996, graduating with the class of 2000. Barbara graduated from Yale University with a BA in Humanities and Harvard Kennedy School with a Master in Public Administration as a fellow with the Center for Public Leadership. After graduating, she lived in the Greenwich Village neighborhood of New York City.

Smithsonian and activism in Africa
She worked for the Cooper Hewitt, Smithsonian Design Museum, a subsidiary of the Smithsonian Institution. Previously, she had been working with AIDS patients in Africa: Tanzania, South Africa, and Botswana, among other places, through a program sponsored by the Houston-based Baylor College of Medicine's International Pediatrics AIDS Initiative.

Global Health Corps 
Barbara is the co-founder and president of a public health-focused nonprofit, Global Health Corps. Global Health Corps provides opportunities for young professionals from diverse backgrounds to work on the front lines of the fight for global health equity. In 2009, Global Health Corps won a Draper Richards Foundation Fellowship, and Bush was made a 2009 Echoing Green fellow for her work with Global Health Corps.  Bush was also chosen as one of the 14 speakers selected from an applicant pool of 1,500 to speak at the TEDx Brooklyn event in December 2010, where she spoke about Global Health Corps.

Political activity
In 2011, Bush released a video with the Human Rights Campaign, the nation's largest lesbian, gay, bisexual, and transgender (LGBT) civil rights organization, calling on New York State to legalize same-sex marriage. "'I am Barbara Bush, and I am a New Yorker for marriage equality,'" she said in the brief message, sponsored by an advocacy group. "New York is about fairness and equality. And everyone should have the right to marry the person that they love.'" Bush joined other children of prominent Republican politicians—including Meghan McCain and Mary Cheney—in endorsing gay marriage.

Bush's graduation from Yale in May 2004 was given heavy media coverage. She and Jenna made several media appearances that summer prior to the 2004 U.S. Presidential election, including giving a speech to the Republican Convention on August 31. She and Jenna took turns traveling to swing states with their father and also gave a seven-page interview and photo shoot in Vogue. Jenna later confirmed that Barbara and Jenna also developed a friendship with John Kerry's daughters, Alexandra and Vanessa, who campaigned on behalf of their father, Kerry. Bush joined her mother on diplomatic trips to Liberia in January 2006 to attend the inauguration of President Ellen Johnson Sirleaf and to Vatican City to meet with Pope Benedict XVI in February 2006.

Unlike most of her relatives (but like her twin sister Jenna), Bush is not a member of the Republican Party. In 2010,  Bush and her sister told People that they preferred not to identify with any political party, stating, "We're both very independent thinkers."

Personal life
Bush and her sister authored the joint memoir Sisters First: Stories from Our Wild and Wonderful Life, published in 2017. On October 7, 2018, she married screenwriter Craig Coyne in a private ceremony at the Bush family compound in Kennebunkport, Maine, with only 20 people attending. It was held then in part so that Bush's grandfather, George H. W. Bush, whose health was on the decline at the time, could attend. They held an additional wedding reception six months later in April 2019 with 100 guests. Their daughter, Cora, was born in September 2021.

Works

References

External links

Archived profile page at Global Health Corps (from April 2013)

1981 births
20th-century American women
21st-century American women
Activists from New York (state)
American debutantes
American founders
American health activists
American nonprofit executives
Austin High School (Austin, Texas) alumni
Bush family
Children of presidents of the United States
Daughters of national leaders
Founders of charities
HIV/AIDS activists
American LGBT rights activists
Living people
People from Dallas
People from Greenwich Village
Texas Independents
American twins
Women founders
Women nonprofit executives
Yale University alumni
Activists from Texas
New York (state) Independents
Hockaday School alumni
Harvard Kennedy School alumni